Pandit Jagat Narain Mulla (14 December 1864 — 11 December 1938) was a prominent lawyer and public prosecutor in the United Provinces during the British Raj. He is noted for contesting the Kakori conspiracy case on behalf of the British. He was a public prosecutor.

Early and personal life
Jagat Narain Mulla was born to Pandit Kali Sahay Mulla who was in government service in the United Provinces. He studied law from Agra University and started his legal practice in Lucknow. He was close to many prominent persons such as Motilal Nehru, Babu Ganga Prasad Verma, C. Y. Chintamani and Bishan Narayan Dar.

He was the father of Anand Narain Mulla, an Urdu poet and Member of Parliament in independent India.

Career
Jagat Narain was the Chairman of the Reception Committee of the Lucknow session of the Indian National Congress in 1916. He was the President of the Lucknow Municipality for 15 years. He was a member of the Hunter Commission appointed to inquire into the events in Punjab following the Jallianwala Bagh massacre. After the Montagu–Chelmsford Reforms he was elected as a member of the United Provinces Legislative Council and was appointed as the Minister for Local Self-Government. He was also the Vice-Chancellor of the University of Lucknow for three years.

He was also the public prosecutor in the Kakori Conspiracy Case of 1926 and had proved the involvement of HRA in the robbery.

1864 births
1938 deaths
Kashmiri people
Kashmiri Pandits
Kashmiri Brahmins
19th-century Indian lawyers
20th-century Indian lawyers